Nanditha (born 28 February 1978) is an Indian singer. Best known as a playback singer in the Kannada film industry, she sings in other languages such as Tamil and Telugu. Nanditha began her playback career from the film Habba (1998). Since then, she has won numerous awards including the Karnataka State Film Awards and Filmfare Awards South for her singing.

Early life
Nanditha completed her BE from R V College of Engineering (RVCE), Bangalore. She worked as a software engineer for Cisco systems for some time. She left the job and got involved fully into music. She is also a trained veena player. Her musical career started as a track singer for music director Hamsalekha. He gave her the first break in his film Habba in 1998.

Career
Nanditha has worked with many composers including Ilayaraja, Mano Murthy, Hamsalekha, V. Manohar, Rajesh Ramanath and others. She has won the Karnataka state award for three consecutive times and she is the only singer so far from Karnataka to achieve that. She has established herself as a dubbing artist too. She has dubbed for hit films like Nanna Preethiya Hudugi (for Deepa), Paris Pranaya (for Minal patel). She has won many filmfare awards including the SIIMA award for best female singer for the song Kariya I love you from Duniya.

Notable songs
Some of her songs are
 "Jo Jo" (Dr. B. R. Ambedkar)
 "Baaramma Rama" (Dr. B. R. Ambedkar)
 "Moda Modalu" (Yeshwant)
 "Akka" (Kallarali Hoovagi)
 "Sihi Gali" (Aa Dinagalu)
 "Kariya I Love You" (Duniya)
 "Hoo Kanasa Jokali" (Inthi Ninna Preethiya)
 "Baara Sanihake Baara" (Apthamitra)

Television

Awards
Karnataka State Film Awards
 2002: Best Female Playback Singer for "Bili Bannada Gini" from Gandhada Gombe
 2003: Best Female Playback Singer for "Yede Tumbi Hadidenu" from Paris Pranaya
 2004: Best Female Playback Singer for "Aakashake Obba" from Jogula
 2009: Best Female Playback Singer for "Baanige Bhaskara Chanda" from Mandakini

Filmfare Awards South
 2007: Best Female Playback Singer – Kannada for "Kariya I Love You" from Duniya
 2009: nominated, Best Female Playback Singer – Kannada for "Neenendare" from Raam

Udaya Film Awards
 2007: Best Female Playback Singer for "Kariya I Love You" from Duniya

Suvarna Film Awards
 2007: Best Female Playback Singer for "Kariya I Love You" from Duniya

Other awards
 2008: Favorite Singer at SFM Kalaa Awards

References

External links
 

Living people
Indian women playback singers
21st-century Indian singers
Kannada people
Singers from Karnataka
Kannada playback singers
Telugu playback singers
Filmfare Awards South winners
1978 births
Film musicians from Karnataka
People from Hassan district
21st-century Indian women singers
Women musicians from Karnataka